Strato II Soter (Strátōn B΄ ho Sotḗr; epithet means "the Saviour") also known as Stratha, was an Indo-Greek king. He ruled c. 25 BCE to 10 CE according to Bopearachchi. R. C. Senior suggests that his reign ended perhaps a decade earlier. He may have been supplanted by the Indo-Scythian Northern Satraps, particularly Rajuvula and Bhadayasa, whose coins were often copied on those of the last Indo-Greek kings. Numerous coins of Rajuvula have been found in company with the coins of the Strato group in the Eastern Punjab (to the east of the Jhelum) and also in the Mathura area: for example, 96 coins of Strato II were found in Mathura in conjunction with coins of Rajuvula, who also imitated the designs of Strato II in the majority of his issues.

Rule

Strato II ruled in the eastern Punjab, probably retaining the capital of Sagala (modern Sialkot, Pakistan), or possibly to the city of Bucephala (Plutarch, p. 48 n. 5).

His territory was invaded by Rajuvula, Indo-Scythian king of Mathura, and he became the last of the Indo-Greek kings, together with his son Strato III "Philopator" ("the father-loving"), who was included as joint regent on some of his coins and also issued coins on his own.

A few silver coins with a different portrait and the inscription Strato Soter Dikaios ("the just") may also belong to Strato III as sole ruler, or to a fourth king named Strato.

Just like the earlier king Strato I, the last Stratos are thought to belong to the dynasty of Menander I, who also used the epithet Soter and the symbol of standing Pallas Athena.

Coins of Strato II, III and Strato Dikaios

The chronology of the late Indo-Greek kingdom has been established by Bopearachchi and other scholars from numismatical evidence alone. The coins deteriorated continuously, the Strato coins being the most debased and crude in style, a striking contrast to earlier kings who struck some of the most beautiful coins of antiquity.

The decay was due to the increasing pressure of the Indo-Scythian nomads on the remaining Greek pockets, as well as their long isolation from the rest of the Hellenistic world.

Strato II and III used exclusively a single "boxy" mint-mark, which they had in common with late Indo-Greek kings such as Apollophanes and was initiated by Dionysios Soter.

Strato II, Strato III and Strato Dikaios struck debased silver drachms, which as mentioned portray Pallas on the reverse. Strato II appears as an old man with a sunken jaw on some of his coins, which is not surprising given that his grandson was co-regent.

Strato II also issued bronzes and even lead coins of the common type Apollo/tripod. On some of Strato II's silver drachms the letter sigma is written as C (a lunate sigma), a not uncommon trait on late Hellenistic coins in the east.

Imitations by Indo-Scythian rulers

Subsequent Indo-Scythian rulers, who replaced the Stratos in their territories, designed their coins in direct imitation of those of Strato II. This is the case of the Northern Satraps, who ruled in the territories from Sagala in Eastern Punjab to Mathura, such as Rajuvula, Bhadayasa. Just as the Yuezhi had copied the coins of the last Greco-Bactrian ruler Heliocles in Bactria, or the Indo-Scythians had copied the coins of the last western Indo-Greek ruler Hermaios in the area of Kabul, here again the Indo-Scythian Northern Satraps relied heavily on the numismatics of their predecessors. The fact that powerful new rulers such as Rajuvula extensively adopted these coin designs tends to suggest that Strato II had been quite a significant ruler in his eyes.

See also
 Indo-Greek Kingdom
 Greco-Buddhism
 Indo-Scythians

Notes and references
Notes

References

Bibliography
 At the Internet Archive.

External links
 Coin India Strato II and III
  Les Rois Straton II et III

Indo-Greek kings
1st-century BC rulers in Asia
1st-century monarchs in Asia
Greek Buddhist monarchs
Euthydemid dynasty